Ferox trout (Salmo ferox) is a variety of trout found in oligotrophic lakes/lochs of Ireland, England, Scotland and Wales. Ferox trout is a traditional name for large, piscivorous trout, which in Scotland feed largely on Arctic char. It has been argued to be a distinct species, being reproductively isolated from "normal" brown trout (Salmo trutta) of the same lakes, particularly in Ireland. However, it is uncertain whether the ferox of different lakes are all of a single origin. This fish grows to a length of  SL.

Scottish authorities currently do not regard Scottish ferox to be taxonomically distinct from Salmo trutta.

See also
Dollaghan
Gillaroo
Sea trout

References

Salmo
Fish described in 1835